The Reign of Quantity and the Signs of the Times is a 1945 book by the French intellectual René Guénon, in which the author offers a comprehensive explanation, based on tradition, of the cyclical conditions that led to the modern world in general and to the Second World War in particular. The book was published with the support of Jean Paulhan from Gallimard, who created a collection exclusively dedicated to "Tradition" in order to publish Guénon.

History according to Guénon 

For Guénon, history is only the reflection of a vast cosmic process taking its source in a metaphysical dimension (according to his metaphysical doctrine).
From the traditionalist perspective, the temporal, phenomenal world is an outflow and manifestation of an unseen metaphysical reality that forms the origin and basis of the material, historical reality human beings perceive with their five senses. It has been claimed by several mid-twentieth-century French authors that such a conception of History is radically different from that of the philosopher Georg Wilhelm Friedrich Hegel, who—according to these thinkers—locks history in the sphere of time.
More precisely, as Georges Vallin explains, in Hegel's thought, the timeless mystery of non-duality, of the "coincidence of opposites" found in Guénon, is replaced by "a time-based dialectic of thesis and antithesis." For Vallin, this notion of confinement in time of the human condition, in opposition to the "metaphysical perspective" of Guénon, continued with the conception exposed by the philosopher Martin Heidegger in Being and Time. For Guénon, such a confinement of History in Time, cut off from any transcendent reality, takes on a satanic dimension that explains the fall of the modern world.

However, Vallin, like many thinkers in mid-twentieth-century France, directs his criticism at the Hegel of the earlier work, Phenomenology of Spirit. Hegel's next book, the Science of Logic, attends to the metaphysics that Vallin et al. charge Hegel with neglecting. Such misunderstanding is typical of post-WWII French thinking. Much like Plato and Aristotle, Hegel develops a metaphysic of the timeless form or Idea that grounds the endless flux of transitory appearances, which is the domain of the empirical paradigm criticized by both Guénon and Hegel but necessarily accepted by phenomenologists such as Husserl and Heidegger. This is why Heidegger's attitude towards the metaphysical tradition is—unlike Hegel and Guénon—decidedly negative. Building on Nietzsche, Heidegger originates the notion of the destruction of metaphysics in order to recover a more primordial relationship to Being, which he claims have been forgotten. Hegel and Guénon, by contrast, are metaphysicians. Collin Cleary has argued that Heidegger and Guénon are not compatible, on account of their diverging attitudes towards the philosophical tradition.

Many traditionalists understand Heidegger and other followers of Nietzsche as representing an even further fall away from tradition than modern philosophy. If Kant is a fall from metaphysics, and Hegel is an attempt to rescue metaphysics, then the postmodern rebellion against Hegel ends up being a continuation of the Kantian critique of metaphysics, another fall:[Frithjof] Schuon criticizes those post-Kantian schools based on either rationalism or empiricism which cannot grasp the meaning of the intellect as source of knowledge and usually end up with one or another type of sensual empiricism. Schuon is even more relentless against the antirationalistic philosophies which follow Hegel and which result in various kinds of modern existentialism based on the total destruction of the functioning of the intellect and even its mental image, reason, and which in the attempt to go beyond Hegelian rationalism fall below it, preparing the way for that loss of the very coherence of thought which is a characteristic of much that passes for philosophy today.The poet Charles Upton writes that: 

John Griffin also writes that:  

And Lee Penn that:

Reception 

After the publication of the book, two new movements, communism and existentialism, started to dominate and inform the minds of the intellectual elite in France.

More recently; Jacob Needleman, in The Sword of Gnosis writes:

"Many of Guénon's books, notably The Reign of Quantity, are such potent and detailed metaphysical attacks on the downward drift of Western civilization as to make all other contemporary critiques seem half-hearted by comparison."

Harry Oldmeadow, author of Traditionalism: Religion in the Light of the Perennial Philosophy:

"The Reign of Quantity is a brilliantly sustained and excoriating attack on modern civilization [...] The book is a controlled and dispassionate but devastating razing of the assumptions and values of modern science. At the same time it is an affirmation of the metaphysical and cosmological principles given expression in traditional culture and religions."

Translations
There are complete translations of Le règne de la quantité in a number of languages: English, Italian, Spanish, Swedish, Persian, and Turkish. Walter James, 4th Baron Northbourne being among the translators for the 1953 English version.

See also
Cartesianism
List of French philosophers
Modernity
Perennial philosophy
Scientism
Traditionalist School

References

External links
The Reign of Quantity and the Signs of the Times, excerpts on Google Books

1945 non-fiction books
Books by René Guénon
French non-fiction books
Metaphysics books
Philosophy books
Traditionalist School